Coverham with Agglethorpe is a civil parish in Richmondshire district of North Yorkshire, England. It includes the villages of Coverham and Agglethorpe. The population of the civil parish was estimated at 90 in 2015.

References 

Civil parishes in North Yorkshire
Coverdale (dale)